Castel Giorgio is a comune (municipality) in the Province of Terni in the Italian region Umbria, located about  southwest of Perugia and about 60 km northwest of Terni on the Alfine Highland, facing the Lake Bolsena.

The municipality of Castel Giorgio is also known as "European Capital of American Football" because within the territory of the town there is the "Vince Lombardi stadium", the first gridiron football field in Italy designed for this sport.

History

In 1993,remains from prehistoric Villanovan civilization settlements were found in the area of Castel Giorgio. Also present are an Etruscan necropolis (3rd-2nd centuries BC) and remains of Roman villas and roads (Via Traiana Nova and Via Cassia).

The town was founded in 1477, as castle and residence for the bishop of Orvieto, Giorgio della Rovere. After several vicissitudes, the palace was restored by Cardinal Giacomo Sannesio in 1610–1620, turning it into a summer resort for the prelates of Orvieto.

References

External links

Cities and towns in Umbria
Populated places established in the 1470s
Villanovan culture